Anatrachyntis orphnographa is a moth in the family Cosmopterigidae. It was described by Edward Meyrick in 1936, and is known from the Democratic Republic of the Congo.

References

Moths described in 1936
Anatrachyntis
Moths of Africa